Alexon was an ancient Greek mercenary from Achaea, who served in the Carthaginian garrison at Lilybaeum while it was besieged by the Romans in 250 BC, during the First Punic War. During this siege some of the Gallic mercenaries engaged in the service of the Carthaginians began planning to betray the fortress into the hands of the Romans. But Alexon, who had on a former occasion saved the town of Agrigentum from a similar attempt of treacherous mercenaries, now acted in the same spirit, and gave information of the plot to the Carthaginian commander Himilco. He also assisted him in inducing the remaining mercenaries to stay faithful and resist the temptations offered by their comrades.

References 

Ancient Achaeans
Ancient Greek mercenaries
Carthaginian commanders of the First Punic War
3rd-century BC Greek people